German submarine U-429 was a Type VIIC U-boat of Nazi Germany's Kriegsmarine originally built for the Italian Regia Marina during World War II. Her keel was laid down on 14 September 1942 by Danziger Werft of Danzig. She was then commissioned as S-4 on 14 July 1943 under the command of Tenente di vascello Angelo Amendolia.

These boats were not deemed advanced or useful enough for full war service, and on 27 October 1943 they were turned over to training flotillas for service in the Baltic Sea, training up submarine crews for dispatch to operating boats, mainly based in France. After a very uneventful service life, the U-429 was caught in an open dock during a U.S. Eighth Air Force raid on the city of Wilhelmshaven on 30 March 1945, and destroyed by bombing, although her crew were not on board at the time of the attack.

Design
German Type VIIC submarines were preceded by the shorter Type VIIB submarines. U-429 had a displacement of  when at the surface and  while submerged. She had two shafts and two  propellers.

U-429 was fitted with five  torpedo tubes (four fitted at the bow and one at the stern), fourteen torpedoes, one  SK C/35 naval gun, 220 rounds, and two twin  C/30 anti-aircraft guns. The boat had a complement of between forty-four and sixty.

Modern dramatization

References

Bibliography

External links

German Type VIIC submarines
World War II shipwrecks in the North Sea
World War II submarines of Germany
U-boats sunk by US aircraft
U-boats commissioned in 1943
1943 ships
U-boats sunk in 1945
Ships built in Danzig
Maritime incidents in March 1945